The John S. Russwurm House is a house with Federal architecture, dating from 1819, in Triune, Tennessee that was listed on the National Register of Historic Places in 1988.

The listing was for one contributing building on a  that also included are two non-contributing buildings.

It was built by John Russwurm, an early settler of the Williamson County.  As of a 1988 study, the house was deemed to be the best surviving example of either a single or double cell brick residence from its era.  It was built first as a one-story brick residence, and "was later enlarged with a two-story double, cell addition. This double cell arrangement is the only remaining example of this type of construction in Williamson County."

The Constantine Sneed House, also NRHP-listed, seems to have had a double cell plan but has since been altered.

The Russwurm house was delisted from the National Register on November 18, 2011.  Delistings usually occur after a building has been demolished or otherwise lost historic integrity.

See also
John B. Russwurm House, Portland, Maine, also listed on the National Register

References

Houses on the National Register of Historic Places in Tennessee
Houses in Williamson County, Tennessee
Federal architecture in Tennessee
Houses completed in 1819
National Register of Historic Places in Williamson County, Tennessee
Former National Register of Historic Places in Tennessee